On 4 October 2020, a man was killed and another injured during a knife attack in Dresden, Germany. After two weeks, the suspected perpetrator was arrested. Europol classified the attack as jihadist terrorism.

Attack
Two German men, a gay couple, who were visiting Dresden were stabbed with a knife by the suspect. One of the victims, a 55-year-old, died from his injuries, while the other, a 53-year-old, was critically injured but later recovered. The perpetrator fled the scene, and was arrested two weeks later, after his DNA traces were found on the knife, which was recovered near the scene of the attack. An Islamist background was confirmed to be behind the attack; Justice Minister Christine Lambrecht said that "Islamist terror is a major, enduring threat to our society that we have to tackle determinedly."

Suspect
The suspect is identified as 20-year-old Abdullah al-H. H., a Syrian national who arrived in Germany in 2015 to seek asylum. He was previously investigated for planning a terrorist attack, and reported to German authorities by a foreign intelligence service. He had contacts with a woman, a member of the Islamic State: the two were planning an attack in Germany with the help of other militants. After publishing several Islamic State-related symbols and flag on his personal Facebook profile in 2017, Abdullah al-H. H. was investigated as a dangerous radicalized Islamist, who can "carry out an attack at any moment". His home was checked by police, who seized his phone. Investigators discovered that he was planning to join the Islamic State, had contacts with a militant in Yemen and was working on the construction of suicide belts; al-H. H. was then taken into custody. His accomplices were also arrested, including the Islamic State woman who was identified as the leader of the cell, according to police. All of them were sentenced in November 2018 to two years and nine months for supporting a terrorist organization and planning an attack. Abdullah, who also attacked prison guards during his time in jail, was released in September 2020, even if he was still considered "radicalized and dangerous" and was forbidden to possess any sharp objects and firearms. Police were in charge of checking him with a technical surveillance device placed in front of his home. However, he is not checked at every moment. Two days before the attack, he bought a knife, which was the one used in the attack.

Aftermath 
In the aftermath, it was debated in the Bundestag (Federal parliament of Germany) why the Syrian, whose asylum application had been rejected by authorities, had not been deported from the country. Questions were also asked on why the security agencies of Saxony had not monitored him sufficiently.

References 

2020 knife attack
2020 knife attack
Discrimination against LGBT people in Germany
Islamic terrorism in Germany
Islamic terrorist incidents in 2020
October 2020 crimes in Europe
October 2020 events in Germany
Stabbing attacks in 2020
Deaths by stabbing in Germany
Stabbing attacks in Germany
Terrorist incidents in Germany in 2020
Terrorist incidents involving knife attacks#
Violence against LGBT people in Europe